The Mooney Suzuki is the debut extended play (EP) by American garage rock band The Mooney Suzuki.

Released
Released in August 1999, "And Begin", "I Say I Love You" and "My Dear Persephone" were recorded by Matt Verta-Ray at NY HED, New York City in January, 1999; "Half of My Heart", "Turn My Blue Sky Black" and "Love Is a Gentle Whip" were recorded by Kevin McMahon in Maine, New York in August 1998.

Track listing
"And Begin" – 1:30
"I Say I Love You" – 1:59
"My Dear Persephone" – 2:46
"Half of My Heart" – 3:47
"Turn My Blue Sky Black" – 2:47
"Love Is a Gentle Whip" – 2:49

Personnel
The Mooney Suzuki
Sammy James Jr. – vocals, guitar, design
Graham Tyler – guitar, design
John Paul Ribas – bass, design
Will Rockwell-Scott – drums, design
Additional personnel
Matt Verta-Ray – production on "And Begin", "I Say I Love You" and "My Dear Persephone"
Kevin McMahon – production on "Half of My Heart", "Turn My Blue Sky Black" and "Love Is a Gentle Whip"
Josh Lewis – photography

References

The Mooney Suzuki albums
1999 debut EPs